The Pancasila Ideology Development Agency (Indonesian: Badan Pembinaan Ideologi Pancasila, BPIP) is a non-ministerial government agency formed by the Indonesian government in 2018 with Presidential Decree No.7/2018. The agency was tasked with the main task of preserving Pancasila, the state ideology, and its ideological development and implementation. It is the revitalisation of Presidential Unit of Pancasila Ideology Development formed in 2017.

BPIP is not related with Suharto's New Order era Agency for Development, Education, Implementation of Guidelines for the Appreciation and Practice of Pancasila (Badan Pembinaan Pendidikan Pelaksanaan Pedoman Penghayatan dan Pengamalan Pancasila, BP-7), which was renowned for its skewed interpretation of Pancasila and widespread abuse to ideologically indoctrinate most Indonesian citizens at that time, which leads into perpetuation of the New Order.

History 
As ideology unique to Indonesia, efforts to preserve, educate, and develop of Pancasila have been carried out since the 1950. Pancasila has included in basic education system since 1950 thru issuance of Law No. 4/1950. However, in 1959, attempts for Pancasila preservation started to become skewed in practice and used as political tool for gaining the support for ruling regime. During Sukarno administration, Pancasila preservation was hampered due to Sukarno 1959 political manifesto Manipol USDEK, which blended Pancasila with Constitution of 1945, Socialism à la Indonesia, guided democracy, guided economy, and Indonesia nationalism. This manifesto resulted in Pancasila mixed together with leftist ideologies and being used as tool for perpetuation of Sukarno administration. After the Manipol USDEK enshrined thru Provisional People's Consultative Assembly Resolution No. I/MPRS/1960, the resolution required the population to follow Sukarno's interpretation of Pancasila according to him and rejected any alternative interpretation. As tool, Supreme Advisory Council (Indonesian: Dewan Pertimbangan Agung, DPA) was used to socialize and promote Manipol USDEK.

The need of Pancasila preservation become intensified after the failed G30S/PKI coup attempt, after Suharto concluded that Pancasila was no longer practiced by Indonesian population, thus communism was raised as contender and challenged the state ideology. By mandate of People's Consultative Assembly Resolution No. II/MPR/1978, Guidelines for the Appreciation and Practice of Pancasila (Indonesian: Pedoman Penghayatan dan Pengamalan Pancasila, P-4) program launched. On 26 March 1979, thru Presidential Decree No. 10/1979, Agency for Development, Education, Implementation of Guidelines for the Appreciation and Practice of Pancasila (Badan Pembinaan Pendidikan Pelaksanaan Pedoman Penghayatan dan Pengamalan Pancasila, BP-7) founded by Suharto administration. Again, the practice become skewed during Suharto administration. During BP-7 era, interpretation of Pancasila become skewed into veneration of Suharto figure and BP-7 abused to become a tool to ideological indoctrination. Not only BP-7's Pancasila interpretation that become problematic, BP-7 operational costs were very outrageous and massive due to BP-7 structure was so massive at that time, spanning from central government to town level, resulted in inefficient spending and blatant corruption. After reformasi, BP-7 abolished by Habibie by issuance of Presidential Decree No. 27/1999. With no longer have agency dedicated to preserve it, Pancasila no longer protected and threatened. Excessive freedom brought by reformasi, together with abolition of Pancasila studies in post-New Order education system also enabled other foreign ideologies to be imported to Indonesia without filter, resulted in much mixture and loss uniformity in Pancasila teaching and enabled to various interpretation of Pancasila to be exist, further threatening Pancasila as ideology and also resulted in loss of national identity and threatening national resilience.

18 years after dissolution of BP-7, Joko Widodo issued Presidential Decree No. 54/2017, establishing Presidential Unit of Pancasila Ideology Development (Indonesia: Unit Kerja Presiden Pembinaan Ideologi Pancasila, UKP-PIP). UKP-PIP later elevated to BPIP by issuance of Presidential Decree No. 7/2018.

Organizational structure 
The structure of BPIP is largely based on Presidential Decree No. 7/2018. The structure is also expanded with Head of Pancasila Ideology Development Agency Decree No. 5/2021 and No. 2/2018.

 Office of BPIP Steering Committee
Steering Committees
Council of Experts of the BPIP Steering Committee
Special Staffs of the BPIP Steering Committee
BPIP Steering Committee Special Task Forces (Ad-hoc units)
 Executives
 Office of Head of BPIP
 Office of Vice Head of BPIP
 Main Secretariat
Bureau of Planning and Finance
Division of Finance
Subdivision of Financial Governance and Organization Treasury
Subdivision of Accountancy and Financial Reporting
Subdivision of Bureau of Planning and Finance Administration
Bureau of Law and Organization
Division of Legal Drafting
Division of Organization and Governance Affairs
Subdivision of Organization Affairs
Subdivision of Bureaucracy Governance and Reform
Subdivision of Bureau of Law and Organization Administration
Bureau of General Affairs and Human Resources
Division of State Property Management, Procurement Services, and Household Affairs
Subdivision of State Property Management
Subdivision of Procurement Services
Subdivision of Household Affairs
Division of Human Resources Affairs
Subdivision of Human Resources Affairs
Subdivision of Planning and Management of Human Resource Performances
Subdivision of Employee Transfer and Human Resource Development
Subdivision of Bureau of General Affairs and Human Resources Administration
Bureau of Leadership Facilitation, Public Relation, and Administration Affairs
Division of Leadership Facilitation
Subdivision of Facilitation of Steering Committee and Head
Subdivision of Facilitation of Vice Head, Expert Staffs of Steering Committee, Council of Experts, and Expert Groups
Subdivision of Protocol, Material Facilitation, and Leadership Meeting Organizer
Division of Public Relation Affairs
Subdivision of Media Relation and Public Complaints
Division of Administration and Archival Affairs
Subdivision of Main Secretariat Administration 
Subdivision of Deputy I Administration 
Subdivision of Deputy II Administration 
Subdivision of Deputy III Administration 
Subdivision of Deputy IV Administration 
Subdivision of Deputy V Administration
Subdivision of Bureau of Leadership Facilitation, Public Relation, and Administration Affairs Administration
Subdivision of Correspondence and Archives
Bureau of Internal Supervision
Subdivision of Bureau of Internal Supervision Administration
 Deputy I (Relationship between Institutions, Socialization, Communication, and Networking)
Directorate of Relationship between Institutions
Directorate of Socialization and Communication
Directorate of Networking and Cultural Cultivation
 Deputy II (Law, Advocation, and Regulation Monitoring)
Directorate of Analysis and Harmonization
Directorate of Advocation
Directorate of Formulation of Policies and Regulations Recommendation 
 Deputy III (Studies and Materials)
Directorate of Policy Studies of Pancasila Ideology Development
Directorate of Studies of Pancasila Ideology Development Material
Directorate of Assessment of Pancasila Ideology Development Implementation
 Deputy IV (Education and Training)
Directorate of Education and Training Planning
Directorate of Education and Training Standardization and Curriculum Affairs
Directorate of Education and Training Execution
 Deputy V (Control and Evaluation)
Directorate of Control
Directorate of Evaluation
 Data and Information Center
Subdivision of Data and Information Center Administration
 Expert Groups
 Expert Group on Religion, Philosophy, Ideology, and Cultures.
 Expert Group on Law, Politics, and Governances.
 Expert Group on Social Affairs, Economy, and Technology
 Expert Group on Language, Education, Arts and Design, Information, and Communication
 Expert Group on Defense, Security, and International Relations

Connection with BRIN 
With the enforcement of Presidential Decree No. 33/2021, the National Research and Innovation Agency (Indonesian: Badan Riset dan Inovasi nasional, BRIN) also coordinated with Pancasila Ideology Development Agency. Both agency initially shared the same Steering Committee. With the revision of the BRIN constituting document thru Presidential Decree No. 78/2021, the BRIN Steering Committee altered, and save only the Head of BRIN Steering Committee position to be filled with the Head of BPIP Steering Committee, while other steering committee now mixed from Ministry of Finance, Ministry of National Development Planning, academicians, and professionals.

BPIP Involvement in 2022 Curriculum Reform 
For 2022 Curriculum Reform, BPIP developed Pancasila education materials. 15 Pancasila learning books were produced, as result of BPIP research and development. The materials designed for cover Pancasila education for Early Childhood Education, Elementary Education, Junior High Education, Middle High Education and Vocational Education, and Higher Education level. The books launched on 1 June 2022.

In occasion of 2022 Pancasila Day celebration, on 3 June 2022, Ministry of Education, Culture, Research, and Technology announced that Pancasila studies officially returned to all level of Indonesia education system after being removed since reformasi. The ministry, through its Agency of Education Standards, Curriculum, and Assessments (Indonesian: Badan Standar, Kurikulum, dan Asesmen Pendidikan, BSKAP) announced that the books will be used for new mandatory course Pancasila studies, replaced the previously secular-modeled civic studies course.

References 

Government agencies of Indonesia
Pancasila (politics)
Joko Widodo